Liptovské Matiašovce is a village and municipality in Liptovský Mikuláš District in the Žilina Region of northern Slovakia.

History 
In historical records the village was first mentioned in 1416.

Geography 
The municipality lies at an altitude of 626 metres and covers an area of 5.733 km². It has a population of about 290 people.

References

External links 
https://web.archive.org/web/20160411124252/http://liptovskematiasovce.e-obce.sk/

Villages and municipalities in Liptovský Mikuláš District